Sonlez is a village in Luxembourg.

Location and population
It is situated in the commune of Winseler, in north-western Luxembourg.  , the village has a population of 47.
It is situated between Tarchamps (West) and Doncols (East)

Linguistic features
Sonlez is known as an historically Walloon-speaking village, similarly to Doncols. Unlike neighbouring Doncols, however, its German and Luxembourgish spellings are identical.

See also
 Doncols#Historical and linguistic backgrounds

Villages in Luxembourg
Wiltz (canton)